Alan Cooper (born 1952) is an American software designer and programmer.

Alan Cooper may also refer to:

People
 Alan Cooper (bishop) (1909–1999), Anglican bishop
 Alan Cooper (biblical scholar), provost of the Jewish Theological Seminary of America
 Alan J. Cooper (born 1966), evolutionary molecular biologist and Ancient DNA researcher
 Allan Cooper (1916–1970), Australian cricketer
 Allen Foster Cooper (1862–1917), politician

Characters
 Alan Cooper (The Inbetweeners)